José Joaquín Rodríguez Zeledón (6 January 1837 – 30 November 1917) was President of Costa Rica from 1890 to 1894.

Rodríguez was born on 6 January 1837. He studied law at the University of San Carlos of Guatemala, but owing to family matters and economic circumstances he had to break off his studies and return to Costa Rica. However, he did eventually graduate with a law degree from the Universidad de Santo Tomás in San José.

He was a prestigious lawyer who had never made any active forays into the country's politics, but he had distinguished himself as the Magistrate of the Supreme Court of Justice (Corte Suprema de Justicia). For a short time he also occupied the post of Secretary of State in Bernardo Soto's government.

He attained the presidency by being elected with a considerable majority, ushering in a new era for the country that would end with imposed governments.

Rodríguez sought the clergy's support to be able to govern. The liberals became alarmed and decided to support the president, who accepted this group's collaboration, succeeding in beating the Catholic Party in the midterm elections for deputies.

In 1892, he dissolved the Congress, and even as dictator kept the title President. In 1893 he established once again individual guarantees so that voting for his successor could go ahead with greater freedom. The winner was the Minister of War and the Navy, Don Rafael Yglesias Castro, the Civil Party candidate.

Rodríguez had to govern during a time of great conflict and his main preoccupation was his homeland's welfare. His methods of keeping order have been censured by the citizenry.

Among his successes are his measures favouring education. He established night schools for adults in the national capital and provincial cities. He hailed the contract to establish the telephone service in the capital and the provinces. He started construction on the National Theatre.

José Joaquín Rodríguez Zeledón died on 30 November 1917.

Personal life 
Rodríguez's parents were Sebastián Rodríguez Mora and Francisca Zeledón Aguilar. His wife was Luisa Alvarado Carrillo. They had several children together and, coincidentally, one of them, Manuela Rodríguez Alvarado, married Rodríguez's successor, Rafael Yglesias Castro.

Rodríguez's main successes 
 He signed contracts to establish Costa Rica's first telephone service in 1891.
 He favoured education and created night schools for adults.
 He started construction on the National Theatre in 1890.
 He promoted European immigration for the country's colonization and agricultural development.

References 
 http://www.guiascostarica.com/presi/presi19.htm

1837 births
1917 deaths
People from San José, Costa Rica
Presidents of Costa Rica
Vice presidents of Costa Rica
Universidad de San Carlos de Guatemala alumni
19th-century Costa Rican people
Foreign ministers of Costa Rica
Supreme Court of Justice of Costa Rica judges